This is a list of Estonian Twenty20 International cricketers.

In April 2018, the ICC decided to grant full Twenty20 International (T20I) status to all its members. Therefore, all Twenty20 matches played between Estonia and other ICC members after 1 January 2019 will be eligible for T20I status. Estonia played their first T20Is in a bilateral series against the Cyprus on 5 October 2021, followed by the 2021 Cyprus T20I Cup featuring Cyprus and Isle of Man.

This list comprises all members of the Estonia cricket team who have played at least one T20I match. It is initially arranged in the order in which each player won his first Twenty20 cap. Where more than one player won his first Twenty20 cap in the same match, those players are listed alphabetically by surname.

Key

List of players
Statistics are correct as of 30 July 2022.

References 

Estonia